Prince Ahadzie Daniels, Jr. (P. J.) (born December 12, 1982) is a former American football running back. He played for the Baltimore Ravens of the National Football League in 2006. He was drafted in the fourth round of the 2006 NFL Draft by the Baltimore Ravens as the 132nd overall pick.

College career
While at Georgia Tech, he majored in management and minored in chemistry. In four years, Daniels had over 3,300 yards rushing, 360 yards receiving, 230 kick return yards, and 26 all-purpose touchdowns. The most notable aspect of Daniels' career was that he began the 2002 season as a walk-on and was seventh on the depth chart. Through attrition, flunkouts, and hard work, Daniels became the starter for Georgia Tech in 2003. While at Georgia Tech, he set an NCAA bowl game rushing record with 311 yards and four touchdowns in the 2004 Humanitarian Bowl.

Professional career

Daniels was selected by the Baltimore Ravens in the fourth round (132nd overall) in the 2006 NFL Draft. He did not see the field for the Ravens as a rookie, and was placed on injured reserve before the start of the 2007 season.

References

External links
Georgia Tech Yellow Jackets bio
NFL player bio

Players of American football from Houston
African-American players of American football
American football running backs
Georgia Tech Yellow Jackets football players
Baltimore Ravens players
American sportspeople of Ghanaian descent
1982 births
Living people
21st-century African-American sportspeople
20th-century African-American people